Daniel Paul Wright (born 10 September 1984) is an English footballer who plays as a forward for Havant & Waterlooville. He operates in the target man role, using his height to his advantage.

He has played ten seasons in the National League in service of eight clubs, totalling over 100 goals across more than 300 games. He added 74 games and 12 goals in EFL League Two for Cheltenham Town, already in his 30s.

In his career he won the Conference South with Histon in 2007, the FA Trophy with Wrexham in 2013 and the National League for Cheltenham in 2016.

Career

Histon
Born in Norwich, Norfolk, Wright began his career at nearby Dereham Town of the Eastern Counties Football League. He transferred on deadline day to Histon, and helped them win the Conference South title in 2006–07. After the title had already been sealed, he scored and assisted as they won 2–1 against Sutton United. The Cambridge News wrote:

On 8 November 2008, Wright scored the only goal as Histon beat Swindon Town of Football League One in "one of the shocks of the FA Cup first round". He was sent off on 4 April in a 2–1 loss at Oxford United for elbowing their goalkeeper Billy Turley; Histon were leading at that point.

Wright's final season at Histon began on 8 August 2009 with two goals in a 3–0 win at newcomers Gateshead. In his penultimate game the following 5 April, a 1–1 draw away to Kettering Town, he was dismissed after half an hour for shoving James Jennings.

Conference years
In 2010, Wright moved to another Conference team in Cambridgeshire, Cambridge United, on a three-year deal. He spent one season there, being the top scorer in a struggling team, before leaving to Wrexham for an undisclosed fee on 14 June 2011 to balance the books.

At Wrexham, he scored in each leg of their FA Trophy semi-final 4–2 aggregate win over Gainsborough Trinity in February 2013. In the final at Wembley Stadium on 24 March, he played the full 120 minutes of a 1–1 draw and scored in the penalty shootout win over Grimsby Town.

In May 2013, he left Wrexham and secured a move to Forest Green Rovers where he agreed a two-year contract. He scored his first goal for Forest Green on the opening day of the 2013–14 season in an 8–0 home win over Hyde.

He joined Gateshead on a free transfer on a one-year deal on 29 August 2014. He only remained on Tyneside until 20 January 2015, when he signed for Kidderminster Harriers until the end of the season to be closer to his family in Gloucester.

Cheltenham Town
Although Kidderminster wanted to keep Wright, he signed a one-year deal at Cheltenham Town on 30 June 2015. His new manager Gary Johnson said that he was the "target man" needed at the club. On 20 February 2016, he scored the only goal in a win at Tranmere Rovers, his eighth in the space of six consecutive games. Cheltenham ended up winning the National League and returning to The Football League after a season's absence. However, Wright missed the conclusion of the season with a retrospective three-match ban for stamping on Grimsby Town goalkeeper James McKeown while celebrating a goal he had set up for Harry Pell in a 3–1 win at Whaddon Road. He spoke to the press at his relief of finally winning the National League after eight previous attempts, and said he wanted a new contract as it was his dream to play in The Football League.

In the 2016–17 season, Wright made his Football League debut at the age of 31, in a 1–1 home draw against Leyton Orient on 6 August. He scored his first goal in the division on 10 September, his 32nd birthday, a penalty in a 2–2 draw at Newport County.

On 10 May 2018, it was announced that Wright would leave Cheltenham at the end of his current deal in June 2018.

Solihull Moors
After leaving Cheltenham, Wright returned to the National League by signing for Solihull Moors. The club from the West Midlands beat Hereford to his signature. On 9 February 2019 he was one of four players – two on each team – sent off in a brawl at the end of a 1–0 win at Ebbsfleet United. He scored 11 goals in 41 league games in his first season, concluding with one in a 3–2 win over Havant & Waterlooville on 13 April to seal a play-off place.

Havant & Waterlooville
Wright joined National League South club Havant & Waterlooville in June 2022 following his release from Torquay United.

Personal life
Wright worked as a carpenter while playing for Dereham. In December 2015, his partner Lisa Chew gave birth to their son Ronny 9; the unusual middle name stems from Wright's shirt number.

Career statistics

Club

Honours
Histon
Conference South: 2006–07

Wrexham
FA Trophy: 2012–13

Cheltenham Town
National League: 2015–16

References

External links
 
 

Living people
1984 births
Footballers from Norwich
English footballers
Association football forwards
English carpenters
Dereham Town F.C. players
Histon F.C. players
Cambridge United F.C. players
Wrexham A.F.C. players
Forest Green Rovers F.C. players
Gateshead F.C. players
Kidderminster Harriers F.C. players
Cheltenham Town F.C. players
Solihull Moors F.C. players
Torquay United F.C. players
Havant & Waterlooville F.C. players
National League (English football) players
English Football League players